The International Discworld Convention, also known as DWCon, is a biennial science fiction convention held in the United Kingdom on even-numbered years. DWCon was first held in 1996 by members of the Usenet newsgroup alt.fan.pratchett.

The DWCon is a fan-run convention focussing on the Discworld novels and other works by Terry Pratchett. The programme has several events that appear each time such as the Gala Dinner, Maskerade (spelled in this manner due to Pratchett's novel of the same name), Charity Auction, Guest of Honour Interview, and "Terry's Bedtime Stories". The conventions regularly feature large attendee-run groups that have been known variously as Guilds and Sects. There are also smaller events such as interviews, games and competitions, guest klatches, and other activities.

History
The convention has been held in the UK since 1996. The conventions have been held at various different hotels. A planned convention in 2000 (Titled 'MilleniCon Hand and Shrimp') had to be cancelled for financial reasons, but the conventions have been run every two years since.

While Sir Terry once made a point of attending every UK-based Discworld Convention (and many of the non-UK conventions) as guest of honour, the Convention announced on 1 July 2014 that he would be unable to attend in person due to health reasons, but that he would appear in an on-camera Q&A session from his home instead.

References

External links
 The International Discworld Convention official website
 The North American Discworld Convention
 German Discworld Convention
 Australian Discworld Convention
 Irish Discworld Convention

Discworld organisations